Victon (stylized as VICTON, an acronym for Voice to New World) is a South Korean boy group formed in 2016 by IST Entertainment. The group is composed of six members: Han Seung-woo, Kang Seung-sik, Lim Se-jun, Do Han-se, Choi Byung-chan and Jung Su-bin. They debuted on November 9, 2016, with their extended play Voice to New World. Originally a septet, Heo Chan left the group on October 11, 2022.

History

Pre-debut
Members Chan, Seungwoo, Seungsik and Byungchan joined A Cube Entertainment in 2014 and were among the company's first batch of male trainees. Hanse and Sejun joined a year later, followed by last-minute addition, former Cube Entertainment trainee Subin. Several of the members had experience working with their label-mates whilst still trainees, having been back-up dancers for Apink at their 2015 "Pink Island" concerts and recorded backing vocals for Huh Gak's album.

2016: Me & 7 Men and debut
In August 2016, Plan A Entertainment (formerly A Cube Entertainment) released details regarding the new group they planned to debut, referred to as "Plan A Boys", and their upcoming reality show that would chronicle the group's preparation for debut, titled Me & 7 Men, with the first episode airing August 30 on Mnet.

On September 1, Seungsik, Sejun and Hanse released a digital single as Plan A Boys in collaboration with Huh Gak titled "#Begin Again", accompanied by a music video starring Huh Gak and all seven members of the group.

Following the finale of Me & 7 Men, the group's official debut was set for November 9. For their debut, Plan A held a debut showcase for the group on November 9, announcing their group name Victon, an acronym for "Voice to a New World", with their debut EP Voice to New World with the dual title tracks "I'm Fine" and "What Time Is It Now?" being released the same day.

2017: Further EP releases 
On March 2, 2017, Victon released their second EP, Ready, with the lead single titled "Eyez Eyez". Despite being relative rookies, the members were personally involved in the production process, with Hanse writing all his rap parts and Chan and Seungwoo co-creating the choreography for "Eyez Eyez" and the other promoted song "Blank" (얼타). "Eyez Eyez" is primarily in the futuresynth genre, with the group's second EP intended to show a different musical side to the group than their debut release. Critics also noted from its music video and more sophisticated choreography that the group had adopted a more mature and charismatic image.

Victon's third EP, Identity, was released on August 23, with a total of five tracks including the lead single "Unbelievable". They also held a comeback showcase at the Samsung Hall at Ewha Womans University on the same day as the album's release.

Their fourth EP, From. Victon, was released on their one year anniversary on November 9. The EP contains six tracks including the title track "Remember Me".

2018: Busking project and Time of Sorrow 
On February 18, 2018, Plan A Entertainment announced that Victon would have a three-week busking project in various locations throughout Seoul and Gyeonggi Province. They performed songs from their previous albums as well as unreleased songs such as "On My Way", performed by Hanse and Seungsik.

On May 23, Victon released their first single album Time of Sorrow. The song topped the Tower Records chart in Japan, despite the group not having made their official debut in the country and only performed at KCON Japan.

2019: Produce X 101 participation, comeback with 6 members 
In early 2019, Seungwoo and Byungchan participated as contestants in Produce X 101. On July 11, it was announced by Play M Entertainment (formerly Plan A) that Byungchan would be leaving the show permanently to recover from the increasing pain from his chronic Achilles tendinitis. On the final episode on July 19, Seungwoo came third in the vote rankings and became a member of new boy group X1, originally on a contract for five years.

Victon made their comeback as a six-member group on November 4 with their fifth mini album Nostalgia and lead single "Nostalgic Night". The release attracted much more attention and the group became a top 3 trending search topic on domestic online music sites. "Nostalgic Night" earned the group their first music show win since their debut. After completing domestic promotions, they embarked on an Asian concert tour, playing at venues in Thailand, Philippines, Japan and Taiwan before concluding it with two sold-out encore concerts at the Olympic Hall in Seoul, the first time they have held their own full concert.

2020: Continued releases and solo work
Play M announced on January 29 that following a solo fanmeeting in February, Seungwoo would return to promote with Victon and the group would make a comeback in March, following X1's disbandment earlier that month. On March 9, Victon released their sixth mini album Continuous and its lead single "Howling". Their lead single, “Howling”, achieved first place on The Show, on March 17, and was the group's first win with all seven members. It was announced later by Play M that member Byungchan would sit out of group promotions due to a herniated disk in his neck. From April 14 Seungwoo and Seungsik co-hosted the radio show Blanket Kick (이불킥), which airs on Naver's streaming app Naver NOW. on Tuesday nights; Chan eventually replaced Seungwoo as co-host on July 20, 2021, due to the latter's impending enlistment.

On June 2, the group returned with their second single album Mayday. They won first place on The Show on June 9 for "Mayday", marking the group's third win.

In August, Seungwoo made his solo debut with the EP Fame and lead single "Sacrifice", making him the first member of Victon with an official solo debut.

In October, Hanse confirmed he was working on a solo mixtape release, although without a set release date.

On November 4, it was announced that Victon would be releasing their first full studio album Voice: The Future Is Now on December 1 with the lead single "What I Said". Subsequently, it was announced that the release of their new album would be delayed after the members had come into contact with an external staff member who had tested positive for COVID-19. Although all members tested negative, they decided to complete the quarantine period.

2021: Voice: The Future is Now and Seungwoo's enlistment
Following the delay, the album was released on January 11, 2021. The group held a comeback show that same day and it was aired on Mnet and its digital channel M2. The album includes four solo songs, one each for Seungsik, Chan, Sejun and Hanse, respectively.

Following the release of their first studio album, the members worked on solo projects in 2021. In March, Hanse and Chan participated in Seoul Fashion Week as models for the collection "SETSETSET", marking their second consecutive appearance as models at Seoul Fashion Week. Seungwoo released his second EP Fade and lead single "See You Again" on June 28. He enlisted for his mandatory military service as a member of the military band on July 28. Then, in August, Seungsik released the single "Look for the Silver Lining" in collaboration with the music company Clef, as part of a donation project for the charity Good Neighbors. Then, Hanse made his solo debut on September 25 with the digital album Blaze with the double title tracks "Take Over" and "Public Enemy".

In October, Seungsik, Hanse, Sejun, and Chan participated in a charity project with the charity Good Neighbors for the International Day for the Eradication of Poverty.

On November 9, Victon released the single "Sweet Travel" to commemorate their fifth anniversary. On November 26, Chan tested positive for COVID-19.

2022: Chronograph, Chaos and Chan's departure
On January 18, Victon returned with their third single album Chronograph. The album included the lead single of the same name and its English version, which is their first song in English. The music video for "Chronograph" reached 10 million views within three days, the fastest of the group's music videos to reach that mark. The album was also noted for offering a more "environmentally conscious" version of buying the album, where those who purchased the album could order a version that just had the normal inclusions of a physical album, such as photocards, but then also receive a digital version of the album.

In March, the group released an original soundtrack for the drama Business Proposal titled "You are Mine", with Seungsik, Sejun, and Byungchan participating.

On May 31, Victon released their seventh mini album Chaos and its lead single "Stupid O'clock".

On October 11, IST Entertainment announced that Chan would be leaving the group following his DUI, and the group will remain with 6 members.

In October, the group announced their eighth EP Choice, was released November 15.

2023: Discharge and military service 
On January 27, 2023, Seungwoo became the first member to be discharged from the military.

On February 1, 2023, the agency confirmed that Seungsik will enlist in the military on March 20, 2023, After basic training, he will be sent to the Army Personnel Command's Army Military Music Equipment Battalion.

Members

Current
 Han Seung-woo 
 Kang Seung-sik
 Lim Se-jun
 Do Han-se
 Choi Byung-chan
 Jung Su-bin

Former
 Heo Chan (2016—2022)

Discography

Studio albums

Extended plays

Single albums

Singles

Collaborations

Music videos (Korean)

Filmography

Reality shows

Awards and nominations

Notes

References

External links

Victon
K-pop music groups
South Korean boy bands
IST Entertainment artists
2016 establishments in South Korea
South Korean dance music groups
Musical groups established in 2016